Ribgrass mosaic virus (RMV) is a species of Tobamovirus. It is an RNA-containing virus with rod-shape particles. It can be found in many wild plant species. This virus does not itself produce serious epidemic diseases, but it served as the inciting pathogen of a necrotic virus disease in burly tobacco.

References

External links

 Descriptions of Plant Viruses

Virgaviridae
Viral plant pathogens and diseases